Cheghapur Rural District is in Kaki District of Dashti County, Bushehr province, Iran. At the census of 2006, its population was 5,391 in 1,113 households; there were 5,261 inhabitants in 1,331 households at the following census of 2011; and in the most recent census of 2016, the population of the rural district was 1,581 in 485 households. The largest of its 28 villages was Ba Monir, with 417 people.

References 

Rural Districts of Bushehr Province
Populated places in Dashti County